Puck Aleshire’s Abecedary (2000) by Michael Swanwick, a collection of short-short stories (one for each letter of the alphabet), initially ran in The New York Review of Science Fiction at a rate of one per month for 26 months starting with Issue 111, November 1997. Each story was accompanied by a collage illustration by the journal's editor Kathryn Cramer. Dragon Press collected these stories in a single volume entitled Puck Aleshire’s Abecedary.

There were two editions, a carefully handbound edition produced for Dragon Press by Henry Wessels with linen cloth spine with handmade paper-covered boards and endpapers with deckled edge and a trade paperback edition printed by Odyssey Press in New Hampshire.

Cover art, interior illustration, and book design of both editions are by Kathryn Cramer. Swanwick published a subsequent volume of short-shorts, which initially appeared on the website The Infinite Matrix and were collected as The Periodic Table of Science Fiction.

See also 
 Flash fiction

References 

Short story collections by Michael Swanwick
2000 short story collections